Ober-Flörsheim is an Ortsgemeinde – a municipality belonging to a Verbandsgemeinde, a kind of collective municipality – in the Alzey-Worms district in Rhineland-Palatinate, Germany.

Geography

Location 
Ober-Flörsheim lies on a high plateau in the Rheinhessen wine region. It belongs to the Verbandsgemeinde of Alzey-Land, whose seat is in Alzey.

History 
In 776, Flarlesheim superiori had its first documentary mention in a donation document from Lorsch Abbey. From 1237 until the late 18th century, the Teutonic Knights ran a commandry in the village. From 1506, Ober-Flörsheim belonged to Electoral Palatinate and was made part of the Oberamt of Alzey. In the Thirty Years' War, Swedish troops laid waste the commandry and the village. In 1689, the village was dealt a further blow by French troops under King Louis XIV when they laid the Palatinate waste during the Nine Years' War.

During the wars in the wake of the French Revolution, there was a battle on 30 March 1793 near Ober-Flörsheim in which the Prussians beat the French. Even so, this defeat would not thwart France’s ultimate success in the campaign, and thereby Ober-Flörsheim, along with the rest of the territories on the Rhine’s left bank, was annexed by France in 1797, and the village became part of the Department of Mont-Tonnerre (or Donnersberg in German).

After the Napoleonic Empire had been defeated, Ober-Flörsheim became part of the newly founded province of Rhenish Hesse (Rheinhessen) in the Grand Duchy of Hesse-Darmstadt in 1816.

On 20 March 1945, American troops occupied Ober-Flörsheim, which nevertheless was transferred to the French zone of occupation in the summer of that same year, later also being grouped into the newly formed state of Rhineland-Palatinate, to which the village has belonged ever since. The region, though, is still called Rhenish Hesse, even though it is no longer part of Hesse. Since 1972, Ober-Flörsheim has also belonged to the Verbandsgemeinde of Alzey-Land.

Religion 
Although Ober-Flörsheim was Reformed in the 16th century, Catholic services were reintroduced in 1698. The Reformed once again achieved ascendancy over the parish church in 1705 with the Palatine Church Sharing (Pfälzische Kirchenteilung, whereby Protestants had to share their churches with Catholics). For a long time, the two denominations stood side by side. In 1747, the Lutherans came to be the third denomination in the village, and they were able to build their own church. In 1876, the Free Protestant parish, a breakaway group from the Evangelical Church, was founded.

Population development 
1787 - 516 inhabitants
1815 - 851 inhabitants
1849 - 1,223 inhabitants (858 Evangelical, 272 Catholic, 91 Mennonite)
1870 - 1,094 inhabitants (799 Evangelical, 265 Catholic, 44 Mennonite)
1900 - 1,014 inhabitants (533 Evangelical, 236 Catholic, 231 Free Protestant, 21 Mennonite)
2004 - 1,104 inhabitants
2008 - 1,191 inhabitants (566 Evangelical, 331 Roman Catholic, 67 other, 227 none)
2012 - 1.237 inhabitants (575 Evangelical, 344 Roman Catholic, 35 other, 283 none)
2014 - 1.205 inhabitants (531 Evangelical, 317 Roman Catholic, 34 other, 323 none)

Politics

Municipal council 
The council is made up of 16 council members, who were elected at the municipal election held on 7 June 2009, and the honorary mayor as chairman.

The municipal election held on 25 May 2014 yielded the following results:

Mayors 
The following list is not yet complete.

1800-1810 Franz Müller
1810-1819 Nikolaus Stauff
1819-1831 Johannes Dettweiler
1831-1837 Johannes Mundorff
1838-1843 Johannes Dettweiler
1843-1862 Friedrich Diehl
1862-1871 Jakob Engel
1871-1884 Christian Fauth
1884-1922 Johannes Müller
 Jakob Kratz
 until 1945 Johann Hahn
1945-1946 Georg Müller
1946-1964 Albert Stauff
1964-1999 Werner Pfister
1999-2001 U. Vogt, resigned at Easter 2001
2001–2014 Adolf Gardt
2014–present Sascha Leonhardt

Coat of arms 
The municipality’s arms might be described thus: Azure a fleur-de-lis argent between two mullets of five in chief of the same.

Culture and sightseeing

Museums 
There is a local history museum at the Bürgerhaus (“Citizens’ House” – a community centre, formerly the lordly manor of the Commandry) headed by Werner Pfister. Opening times are by arrangement. In 2002, the Ober-Flörsheim local history and cultural club was founded, which has since acquired about 80 members.

Music 
Besides the Sängerkranz (“Singer Wreath”) men’s singing club established in 1855, which despite being called a “men’s” singing club also has a women’s choir, there are also the Catholic Church music club established in 1912, and an Evangelical church choir.

Buildings 
Saint Peter’s and Saint Paul’s Catholic Parish Church (Pfarrkirche St. Peter und Paul) was built in 1776 and 1777 on the spot where once stood the old parish church. That one was assigned to followers of the Reformed Church at the time of the Palatine Church Sharing in 1705. The Teutonic Knights however, who held the patronage for the Catholic parish, opposed the decision and waged a long legal battle for ownership for the Catholics. Meanwhile, as a result of the disagreements, the old church was falling apart, making it necessary to build the new Renaissance building that stands now. The belltower was built onto the church only in 1930.

Sport 
The TSG 1863 Ober-Flörsheim (sport club) offers, among other things, gymnastics, partner dancing, taekwondo, tennis and football.

Famous people

Sons and daughters of the town 
Sebastian Walter, b. 1848, d. 1922 in Milwaukee, manufacturer (emigrated to Milwaukee in 1866)
 Willy Deutschmann, b. 1880, d. 1960 in Petersbächel, painter, was active in Petersbächel in the Wasgau (Alsace border region in Rhineland-Palatinate). He is said to be the most important painter of the central Wasgau.

Further reading 
768-1968: 1200 Jahre Ober-Flörsheim. Festschrift, herausgegeben von der Gemeinde Ober-Flörsheim. o.O. 1968.
Reif, Friedrich: Geschichte des ehemaligen Marktfleckens, jetzigen Dorfes Ober-Flörsheim. Mainz 1901.
Schmahl, Helmut: Das Ober-Flörsheimer Kriegerdenkmal und sein Stifter Sebastian Walter. Kirchheimbolanden 2001.
Widder, Johann Goswin: Geographisch-historische Beschreibung der Kurpfalz, Bd. 3, Frankfurt am Main 1787

References

External links 

 
Ober-Flörsheim in the collective municipality’s Web pages 
Ober-Flörsheim local history and cultural club 

Alzey-Worms